Emily Hulbert (born 20 December 1995) is an Australian footballer, who last played in Australia for Melbourne Victory in the Australian W-League. During that season, she suffered from glandular fever, which caused her to have a three-month absence from football.

Emily currently plays for the Hofstra University Women's team in Hempstead, NY, while she studies physics at Hofstra.

References

1995 births
Living people
Australian women's soccer players
Melbourne Victory FC (A-League Women) players
Women's association football midfielders
Hofstra Pride women's soccer players